Pleasant Hill is an unincorporated community in Yell County, Arkansas, United States, located on Arkansas Highway 307,  southwest of Danville.

References

Unincorporated communities in Yell County, Arkansas
Unincorporated communities in Arkansas